Aagtekerke was a ship of the Dutch East India Company built in 1724. It was lost without trace during its maiden voyage in 1725–26, when it sailed from Cape of Good Hope in the Dutch Cape Colony to Batavia in the Dutch East Indies.

Description 
Aagtekerke was built in 1724 by the Chamber of Zeeland of the Dutch East India Company, on their wharf in Middelburg. It was named after the nearby village of Aagtekerke. It had crew of 200 men and 36 guns.

Maiden voyage 
On 27 May 1725, the ship sailed out from Fort Rammekens (near Ritthem) under the command of Jan Witboon. The ship first sailed to Cape of Good Hope in the Dutch Cape Colony, where it arrived on 3 January 1726, possibly to load ivory.

On 27 January 1726, the ship left for Batavia in the Dutch East Indies, but was lost without trace. At the time, the ship was carrying silver coins and precious metals with a total value of 200,000 guilders.

There is some evidence from the crew of the wrecked ship  that Aagtekerke may have been wrecked on the Abrolhos Islands, because they found some remains of a Dutch vessel that had been wrecked before them.

See also
List of people who disappeared mysteriously at sea

References

1720s missing person cases
1720s ships
Lost sailing vessels
Maritime incidents in 1726
Missing ships of Australia
People lost at sea
Ships lost with all hands
Ships of the Dutch East India Company
Shipwrecks of Western Australia